Francis Edward "Frank" Carroll (born 8 April 1952) is a former Australian politician.

He was born in Brisbane and qualified with a Bachelor of Commerce and Bachelor of Law from the University of Queensland. He was admitted as a solicitor to the Supreme Court of Queensland and the High Court of Australia in 1976. In 1995 he was elected to the Queensland Legislative Assembly as the Liberal member for Mansfield. He was made Deputy Opposition Whip and Liberal Party Whip shortly after his election, becoming Deputy Government Whip when the Borbidge government took office in 1996. Carroll was defeated at the 1998 state election.

References

1952 births
Living people
Liberal Party of Australia members of the Parliament of Queensland
Members of the Queensland Legislative Assembly
Politicians from Brisbane
University of Queensland alumni
Australian solicitors